The Peru Support Group (PSG) was established in 1983 to raise awareness of human rights violations committed during Peru’s internal armed conflict. It is a UK-based advocacy organisation with a fee-paying membership of approximately 500 people. Lord Avebury (Eric Lubbock) has served as PSG president since 2002 and a number of British MPs including Ann Clwyd and Simon Hughes are sponsors. Other notable sponsors of the organisation included renowned British writers Harold Pinter and Graham Greene. The organisation today campaigns on a wide range of issues including: human rights, indigenous rights, democratic governance and sustainable development, particularly with reference to extractive industries.

Publications

Bebbington, A.J, M. Connarty, W. Coxshall, H. O'Shaugnessy, M. Williams. 2007. Mining and development in Peru, with special reference to the Rio Blanco Project, Piura.  London. Peru Support Group. Translated and published in Peru as: Bebbington, A.J, M. Connarty, W. Coxshall, H.O'Shaugnessy, M. Williams. Minería y Desarrollo en Perú con especial referencia al Proyecto Río Blanco, Piura.  Lima. Instituto de Estudios Peruanos/CIPCA/Oxfam International/Peru Support Group.
Low, P. 2012.Artisanal and Small-Scale Mining in Peru: A Blessing or a Curse?. London. Peru Support Group.

External links

Human rights organisations based in Peru
Human rights organisations based in the United Kingdom